Hits from The Young Ones is an EP by Cliff Richard and The Shadows, released in 1962. The EP is a 7-inch vinyl record and released in mono with the catalogue number Columbia SEG 8159. The record was the number-one EP in the UK for two weeks starting June 2, 1962.

Track listing
Side A
"The Young Ones" (Sid Tepper, Roy C. Bennett)
"Got a funny Feeling" (Bruce Welch, Hank Marvin)

Side B
"Lessons in Love" (Sy Soloway, Shirley Wolfe)
"We Say Yeah" (Peter Gormley, Bruce Welch, Hank Marvin)

Background
The songs are all song performed by Cliff Richard and the Shadows in the film The Young Ones.

Chart performance

The record was the number 1 EP in the UK for 2 weeks starting June 2, 1962.

Personnel
 Cliff Richard - lead vocals
 Hank Marvin – lead guitar,
 Bruce Welch – rhythm guitar
 Jet Harris – bass guitar
 Tony Meehan – drums

References

1962 EPs
The Shadows EPs
EMI Columbia Records EPs
Cliff Richard albums